The 2008–09 Harvard Crimson women's ice hockey team represented Harvard University. Led by Katey Stone, the Crimson went on a 12-game winning streak versus ECAC Hockey opponents. The Crimson would win the ECAC regular-season conference title for the second straight year. In addition, the Crimson would win the Ivy League title.

Offseason

Recruiting

Player stats
Note: GP= Games played; G= Goals; A= Assists; PTS = Points; PIM = Penalties in minutes; GW = Game winning goals; PPL = Power-play goals; SHG = Short-handed goals

Awards and honors
Christina Kessler, First Team All-Ivy League
Sarah Vaillancourt, First Team All-Ivy League
 Sarah Vaillancourt, 2009 First Team All-ECAC 
Sarah Vaillancourt, 2009 ECAC Player of the Year

References

External links
Official Site

Harvard Crimson women's ice hockey seasons
Harvard
Har
Harvard Crimson women's ice hockey
Harvard Crimson women's ice hockey
Harvard Crimson women's ice hockey
Harvard Crimson women's ice hockey